Brigadier Sir James Frederick Gault  (26 June 1902 – 14 January 1977) was a British brigadier and military assistant to General Dwight Eisenhower in the UK during World War II.

James Gault was the son of Leslie Hamilton Gault (1855–1922) and Marion Anderson (1857–1939), one of five children. He was the grandson of Matthew Hamilton Gault. He was educated at Eton College and Trinity College, Cambridge.

Gault was a member of the Scots Guards regiment and served in the Middle East (Egypt and Libya). He was made an MBE in 1941, a Member of the Royal Victorian Order in 1943, an OBE in 1946, and a KCMG in 1952.

James Gault married Elizabeth Pamela Audrey Luby (died 1989), former wife of George Townshend, 7th Marquess Townshend.

References

1902 births
1977 deaths
People educated at Eton College
Alumni of Trinity College, Cambridge
Scots Guards officers
British Army personnel of World War II
Knights Commander of the Order of St Michael and St George
Officers of the Order of the British Empire
Members of the Royal Victorian Order